Tota may refer to:

People
 Tota (bishop), the Bishop of Selsey (in what is now England) in 786
 Tota Roy Chowdhury, an Indian Bengali male actor
 Tota Singh, Indian politician
 Vincenzo Tota, Italian medical doctor specializing in sports medicine
 Matthieu Tota, commonly known as M. Pokora, French singer and songwriter
 Tota, a nickname of Uruguayan international footballer Diego Alfredo Lugano Moreno
 Tota, a nickname of former Mexican international footballer Antonio Carbajal
 André Tota, former French footballer
 Toda Aznárez, also Teuda de Larraun or Tota,  (c. 885–aft. 970), queen-consort of Pamplona

Places
 Tota, Boyacá, a town and municipality in Boyacá Department, Colombia
 Tota, Benin, an arrondissement in the Kouffo department of Benin
 Lake Tota, a lagoon in Colombia

Other uses
 Tales of the Abyss, a 2005 role-playing game for the PlayStation 2 and later Nintendo 3DS
 A clan of the Bharwad people of India
 Tota (moth), a moth of the family Pyralidae